Emperor is the debut EP by the Norwegian black metal band of the same name. It was released in 1993 via Candlelight Records.

In 1993, the EP was made into a split album with Enslaved's EP Hordanes Land.

In 1998, it was reissued with their demo Wrath of the Tyrant. The songs "Wrath of the Tyrant" and "Night of the Graveless Souls" were re-recorded and were originally on the Wrath of the Tyrant demo.

Cover
The cover of the EP is an engraving by Gustave Doré called "Death on a Pale Horse".

Track listing

Personnel

Emperor
Ihsahn – vocals, guitar, synthesizer
Samoth – guitar
Mortiis – bass
Faust – drums

Additional personnel
Emperor – producer
Christophe Szpajdel – logo

References

Emperor (band) EPs
1993 EPs